Guillaume-Alphonse Nantel (November 4, 1852 – June 3, 1909) was a Canadian lawyer, journalist, author, newspaper owner, and politician.  Born in Saint-Jérôme, Quebec, he was elected to the House of Commons of Canada as a Conservative candidate in the Quebec riding of Terrebonne in the 1882 federal election. He resigned less than two months later to allow Joseph-Adolphe Chapleau, the Secretary of State of Canada, to run for office.

In an August 1882 by-election, he was acclaimed to the Legislative Assembly of Quebec in the riding of Terrebonne. He was re-elected in 1886 and 1890. He was acclaimed again in 1892 and re-elected in 1897. He was the commissioner of public works in the cabinets of Charles-Eugène Boucher de Boucherville and Louis-Olivier Taillon. He was also the commissioner of crown lands in the cabinet of Edmund James Flynn. He was defeated in the 1900 elections.

He died in Montreal in 1909. His brother, Wilfrid Bruno Nantel, was also a politician.

References
 
 
 

1852 births
1909 deaths
Businesspeople from Quebec
Journalists from Quebec
Conservative Party of Canada (1867–1942) MPs
Members of the House of Commons of Canada from Quebec
Conservative Party of Quebec MNAs
Lawyers in Quebec
People from Saint-Jérôme
French Quebecers
Burials at Notre Dame des Neiges Cemetery